The Cú Chulainn Coaster is a wooden roller coaster located at Emerald Park in Ashbourne, County Meath, Ireland. Manufactured by The Gravity Group, the wooden coaster features an overbanked turn and opened on 6 June 2015.

History
The Cú Chulainn Coaster was officially announced by Tayto Park in a press release on 19 February 2015, although construction started earlier in August 2014. Ohio-based company The Gravity Group was selected to build the roller coaster, marking their second installation in Europe following Twister at Gröna Lund in Sweden. Construction was completed in May 2015, and the roller coaster opened on 6 June 2015. It was part of a €26 million investment at Tayto Park, which also included 7 other new attractions for the 2015 season. Its theme is based on the mythological lore surrounding Irish hero Cú Chulainn, whom the ride is named after.

Reception

References

External links
 Tayto Park official website

Roller coasters in Ireland
2015 establishments in Ireland